The Colorado Independent was a nonprofit, independent media organization, first reporting news via its online website that was started in July 2006, later "born again" in September 2013 under new, Colorado-based management.

History 
The Colorado Independent, first called Colorado Confidential, was founded as part of a network of local state-based websites that covered regional news, focusing on local government and politics. The network of sites was run by the Washington, D.C.-based Center for Independent Media, later called the American Independent News Network. AINN began shut down its websites in the spring of 2013 due to funding issues. With funding from two local Colorado foundations, editor Susan Greene and managing editor John Tomasic relaunched The Colorado Independent as an independent entity run in Colorado with broader reporting, a new design and a team of veteran journalists from The Denver Post and Rocky Mountain News. In addition to the two local Colorado foundations, The Gill Foundation and the Bohemian Foundation, The Colorado Independent was also supported by grants by the Zell Family Foundation, the Douglas H. Phelps Foundation, and individual online contributions by readers.

Coverage 
The Colorado Independent covered state politics and policy issues such as the economy, education, the environment, energy development, criminal justice, social justice, gay rights and reproductive rights with a focus on criminal-justice issues. It aimed to serve readers and communities throughout the state with a simple idea: “The only bias we have is for good journalism." "The goal is to make impact, to inspire action by moving readers on important issues with stories that provide missing context, unearth buried facts, and amplify unheard voices,” according to its mission statement.

Contributors 
The Colorado Independent featured a twice weekly column by Mike Littwin, a figure in Colorado journalism known for his work at the Rocky Mountain News and The Denver Post. Regular contributors included reporters Tessa Cheek and Bob Berwyn and Pulitzer-winning cartoonist Mike Keefe. John Tomasic, a veteran web newsman, brought years of experience in helping shape the multi-media site in the evolving world of online journalism. Susan Greene, a longtime Denver Post reporter and metro columnist, has tapped her investigative skills and statewide sources to reinvent the Independent.

Despite the fact that the members of The Colorado Independent writing staff are made up of experienced reporters who are veterans from traditional newspapers, The Colorado Independent was initially denied press credentials that would allow the organization to have a reporter at the Colorado House and/or the Colorado Senate. As of January 2015, credentials were approved.

Location 
The operation is headquartered at the Open Media Foundation building in Denver’s Santa Fe Art’s District. Members of the reporting team work out of the newsroom there, and from their communities in Boulder, Summit County, Eagle County and Colorado Springs.

Outreach 
The Colorado Independent holds monthly events and forums open to the public, creating what it calls a “small-media, big news movement” with a focus on a growing audience in its community of Coloradans who want in-depth, smart and soulful news coverage and conversation. Because the site is a nonprofit funded solely by foundation grants and individual donations, it’s not constrained by many of the forces that bridle big media. It invites readers and even other news outlets to “Steal our copy, please. Post it far and wide. Give us credit.”

As part of the Independent’s educational mission, veteran journalists train young staffers and interns the basics of shoe-leather reporting. The Millennials, in turn, teach the newspaper refugees how to broaden their craft through digital-information media.

In February 2014, the Independent had filed for an FCC low power FM radio construction permit, but it was cancelled (and subsequently expired).

References

External links 
 The Colorado Independent

American news websites
Alternative journalism organizations